The Baronial Gutmann family of Gelse and Beliscse (gelsei és beliscsei báró Gutmann) is a Hungarian noble family of Jewish origin, ennobled in the 19th century.

History 
Of this family, Henrik Gutmann from Nagykanizsa founded the family's business in 1836, trading timber and grain. He later became the president of the local Jewish community. In 1869, Henrik Gutmann was granted nobility together with the noble predicate of Gelse (gelsei). He had several sons, Ödön, László, Vilmos and Aladár Gutmann. Vilmos Gutmann (1847-1921), a resident of Nagykanizsa, was made a Royal Councillor on 25 February 1882 and was elevated to the rank of Baron on 16 September 1904, and was given an additional noble predicate of Beliscse (beliscsei). The fourth son, Vilmos, took the family business further, developing the Beliscse woodworking factory into a major enterprise, employing 3,000 people at the turn of the century, and in 1892 he also became one of the founders and main shareholders of the Nagykanizsa brewery. After Vilmos's death, his brother László liquidated the businesses in Nagykanizsa.

Vilmos' grandsons, Baron Alexander (Sándor), born in 1924, and his brother, Baron William (Vilmos), born in 1921, changed their surnames to "Gelsey".

Arms

Sources
 Gudenus János: A magyarországi főnemesség XX. századi genealógiája
 Zalai életrajzi kislexikon

References 

Hungarian noble families
Heraldry